Auguste Jean Baptiste Louis Joseph Marc (born 27 July 1880, date of death unknown) was a French swimmer. He competed in two swimming events and the water polo at the 1900 Summer Olympics, winning a bronze medal in the latter.

See also
 List of Olympic medalists in water polo (men)

References

External links
 

1880 births
Year of death missing
French male swimmers
Olympic swimmers of France
Olympic water polo players of France
Swimmers at the 1900 Summer Olympics
Water polo players at the 1900 Summer Olympics
Olympic bronze medalists for France
Olympic medalists in water polo
Medalists at the 1900 Summer Olympics
Sportspeople from Nord (French department)
19th-century French people
20th-century French people
Place of death missing